UoN may stand for various universities:

 University of Nairobi, Kenya
 University of Newcastle, Australia
 University of Nicosia, Cyprus
 University of Nizwa, Oman
 University of Northampton, UK
 University of Nottingham, UK

UON may stand for:

 UON Pty Ltd.
 Urgent Operational Need, a phrase that especially used by the military.

uon may stand for:

 unless otherwise noted, abbreviation used in electrical engineering and other engineering fields. A common project parameter may be listed to have a certain default value, unless otherwise noted. For example, the legend for a set of construction plans may specify that every receptacle shown on plans is to be mounted at 18" above finished floor, uon. Those few receptacles that will need to be mounted at a different height will each get a note next to them on the plans.